Tombaugh may refer to:

 Tom Baugh (born 1963, as Thomas Anthony Baugh), U.S. American football center
 Clyde Tombaugh (1906-1997, born Clyde William Tombaugh), astronomer who discovered the dwarf planet Pluto
 Tombaugh (crater), a crater on Mars named after Clyde Tombaugh, found in the Elysium quadrangle
 1604 Tombaugh (1931 FH), the asteroid Tombaugh, named after Clyde Tombaugh, discovered by Carl Otto Lampland on 24 March 1931, at the Lowell Observatory
 Tombaugh Regio, a light-colored heart-shaped region on Pluto, named after Clyde Tombaugh
 Tombaugh Cliffs, ice-free cliffs in Antarctica, next to the Pluto Glacier, named after Clyde Tombaugh

See also
 Tom (disambiguation)
 Baugh (surname)